Mirvarid Dilbazi, (19 August 1912, Xanlıqlar, Azerbaijan – 12 July 2001, Baku) was an Azerbaijani poet.

Biography
She was born in the village of Xanlıqlar located in the Gazakh, Azerbaijan. Both of her grandfathers, Haji Rahim and Abdurahman Dilbazi, were poets. In 1921, Mirvarid moved to Baku and got admitted to the newly established Female Boarding School. After six years of studying, Mirvarid started teaching at elementary school in Bilajari. Upon graduation from Azerbaijan Pedagogical Institute, she moved to Guba and continued teaching there.

Mirvarid Dilbazi's first poem, Women's Emancipation, was published in 1927. Her first book, Our Voice, followed in 1934. After that, she wrote numerous poems and children's books such as First Spring (1937), Love for Motherland (1942), Memories (1945), Dream of the Master (1948), Images of life (1967), Algerian Girl (1961), To my younger fellows (1956), Spring is coming (1968), etc.

Between the 1920s and 1930s, the most burning issue among the Azerbaijani intelligentsia related to women's emancipation. This theme became very popular in literature. For example, there was Jafar Jabbarli's play "Sevil,"1 Mammad Said Ordubadi's "Misty Tabriz,"2 and others. What was meant by women's emancipation was first of all taking off the chadors [veils], then women's participation in governmental affairs and women's literacy.

Women's literacy had been forbidden by the religious leaders. Girls were not taught to write; a few of them had managed to learn how to read a bit of the Quran, which was written in the Arabic script.

From her interview:—

Dilbazi has also translated works by writers such as Pushkin, Khagani and Nizami. In 1979, she was named "People's Poet of Azerbaijan". President Heydar Aliyev awarded her with the Istiglal Order (Order of Sovereignty) in 1998. During her long lifetime, Mirvarid witnessed Stalin's Repressions of 1937, the tragic losses of World War II, and the First Nagorno-Karabakh War.

Mirvarid's cousin, Amina Dilbazi, was a well-known Azeri ballet-master and folk-music dancer.

References

External links
 Poetry by Mirvarid Dilbazi. Azerbaijan International Magazine

1912 births
2001 deaths
20th-century Azerbaijani poets
People from Qazax District
Recipients of the Istiglal Order
Azerbaijani women poets
20th-century women writers
Azerbaijani feminists
Soviet poets